Slow cutting is a film editing technique which uses shots of long duration.  Though it depends on context, it is estimated that any shot longer than about fifteen seconds will seem rather slow to many modern-day viewers, especially those who are accustomed to mainstream Western movies, where slow cuts are uncommon.

A famous example of slow cutting can be found in Stanley Kubrick's A Clockwork Orange (1971). In a segment that lasts three minutes and fifteen seconds and contains only three shots, the main character (Alex de Large) is followed as he walks the length of a futuristic record store, meets two young ladies, and brings them back to his (parents') house for sex.

See also
 Long take
 Motion picture terminology
 Fast cutting
 Slow cinema

Cinematic techniques